Muirhead is a northern suburb of the city of Darwin in the Northern Territory of Australia.

History
Muirhead is named in commemoration of James Muirhead who was an Administrator of the Northern Territory and a judge of the Supreme Court of the Northern Territory.  The area comprising Muirhead was part of the suburb of Lee Point.

Subdivision development of this suburb commenced in April 2011.

References

Suburbs of Darwin, Northern Territory